This is a list of Reading Rainbow episodes, hosted by longtime executive producer LeVar Burton. The show premiered on PBS on July 11, 1983. The final episode aired on November 10, 2006; reruns ceased on August 28, 2009. On June 20, 2012, an app for the show was released.

VHS releases distributed by PBS and Pacific Arts

DVD releases

Episodes
155 half-hour episodes produced.

Season 1 (1983)
All episodes this season were directed by Larry Lancit.

Season 2 (1984)
All episodes this season were directed by Larry Lancit.

Season 3 (1985)
All episodes this season were directed by Larry Lancit.

Season 4 (1986)
{| class="wikitable plainrowheaders" width="100%"
|-
! No. inseries !! No. inseason !! Productioncode !! Title 
!Directed by
!Written by!! Original air date(s)
|-
|align="center"|26 || align="center" | 1 || align="center"| 306 || "Animal Cafe" (narrated by Martin Short) (Season 3 leftover)
Review Books: The Dream Eater by Christian Garrison, pictures by Diane Goode; Night Markets: Bringing Food to a City by Joshua Horwitz; The Moon by Robert Louis Stevenson, paintings by Denise Saldutti'|Hugh Martin
|Mark Saltzman|| align="center" |June 23, 1986
|-
|align="center"|27 || align="center" | 2 || align="center"| 307 || "Alistair in Outer Space" (narrated by Arnold Stang)
Review Books: Check It Out!: The Book About Libraries by Gail Gibbons; Maps and Globes by Jack Knowlton, illustrated by Harriett Barton; Commander Toad series by Jane Yolen, pictures by Bruce Degen
|Hugh Martin
|Ronnie Krauss|| align="center" |June 24, 1986
|-
|align="center"|28 || align="center"| 3 || align="center"| 308 || "Feelings" (narrated by Raima Evans, Jessica Mercado, Laura Haymann, Paul Sidoriak, Jonathan Rose, Timothy Oakes, Jerry David, and Pamela Stogner)
Review Books: Fireflies! by Julie Brinckloe; Honey, I Love and Other Love Poems by Eloise Greenfield, pictures by Diane and Leo Dillon; Loudmouth George and the Sixth-Grade Bully by Nancy Carlson
|Hugh Martin
|Ellen Schecter|| align="center" |June 25, 1986
|-
|align="center"|29 || align="center"| 4 || align="center"|309 || "Watch the Stars Come Out" (narrated by Laura Haymann) (Season 3 leftover)
Review Books: Molly's Pilgrim by Barbara Cohen, illustrated by Michael J. Deraney; The Island of the Skog by Steven Kellogg; The Long Way to a New Land by Joan Sandin
|Hugh Martin
|Peter Barton|| align="center" |June 26, 1986
|-
|align="center"|30 || align="center"|5 || align="center"| 310 || "Mama Don't Allow" (narrated by Fred Newman)
Review Books: Alligator Shoes by Arthur Dorros; Apt. 3 by Ezra Jack Keats; Miranda by Tricia Tusa
|Hugh Martin
|Peter Barton|| align="center" |June 27, 1986
|-
|align="center"|31 || align="center"|6 || align="center"| 401 || "Space Case" (narrated by Michael Winslow)
Review Books: Is There Life in Outer Space? by Franklyn M. Branley, illustrated by Don Madden; Astronuts: Space Jokes and Riddles compiled by Charles Keller, illustrated by Art Cumings; Legend of the Milky Way retold and illustrated by Jeanne M. Lee
|Hugh Martin
|Ellen Schecter|| align="center" |August 4, 1986
|-
|align="center"|32 ||align="center"|7 || align="center"|402 || "The Milk Makers" (narrated by Alaina Reed)
Review Books: Baby Animals on the Farm by Hans-Heinrich Isenbart, photographs by Ruth Rau; From Blossom to Honey: A Start-to-Finish Book by Ali Mitgutsch; Whales and Other Sea Mammals by Elsa Posell
|Hugh Martin
|Patti Sullivan|| align="center" |August 5, 1986
|-
|align="center"|33 ||align="center"|8 || align="center"|403 || "Imogene's Antlers" (narrated by Imogene Coca)
Review Books: When Panda Came to Our House by Helen Zane Jensen; The Trek by Ann Jonas; George Shrinks by William Joyce
|Mitchell Geller
|Joan Wilen, Lydia Wilen & Patti Sullivan|| align="center" |August 6, 1986
|-
|align="center"|34 ||align="center"|9 ||align="center"|404 || "Germs Make Me Sick!" (narrated by Molly Mandlin)
Review Books: Guess What? by Beau Gardner; Teddy Bears Cure a Cold by Susanna Gretz, illustrated by Alison Sage; The Microscope by Maxine Kumin, pictures by Arnold Lobel
|Hugh Martin
|Ronnie Krauss|| align="center" |August 7, 1986
|-
|align="center"|35 ||align="center"|10 ||align="center"|405 || "Abiyoyo" (narrated and sung by Pete Seeger)
Review Books: Ayu and the Perfect Moon by David Cox; Blackberry Ink by Eve Merriam, pictures by Hans Wilhelm; Peter and the Wolf adapted by Sergei Prokofiev, illustrated by Erna Voigt
|Larry Lancit & Mitchell Geller
|Mark Saltzman|| align="center" |August 8, 1986
|}

Season 5 (1987)

Season 6 (1988–89)

Season 7 (1989–90)

Season 8 (1990)

Season 9 (1991)

Season 10 (1992)

Season 11 (1993)

Season 12 (1994)

Season 13 (1995)

Season 14 (1996)

Season 15 (1996)

Season 16 (1997)

Season 17 (1998)

Season 18 (2000–01)

Season 19 (2002)All episodes this season were directed by Ed Wiseman.Season 20 (2004–05)All episodes this season were directed by Ed Wiseman.''

Season 21 (2006)

References

Reading Rainbow
Episodes